ESBF Besançon is a French women's handball club based in Besançon. They play in the French Women's First League.

Honours 
French Women's First League: 
Gold: 1988, 1998, 2001, 2003
Bronze: 1996, 1997, 1999, 2000, 2002, 2004, 2005, 2018
Coupe de France:
Winner: 2001, 2002, 2003, 2005
Coupe de la Ligue:
Winner: 2003, 2004
EHF Cup Winners' Cup:
Winner: 2003

Current squad
Squad for the 2022–23 season

Goalkeepers 
 12  Tonje Haug Lerstad
 87  Sakura Hauge
Wingers
RW
 28  Lucie Granier
 31  Sabrina Zazai
LW
 13  Camille Aoustin
 15  Kiara Tshimanga
Line players 
 10  Louise Cusset
 23  Pauline Robert

Back players  
LB
 8  Clarisse Mairot
 43  Nada Corovic
 75  Audrey Dembele 
 88  Leonida Gichevska
CB
 7  Alizée Frécon
 30  Juliette Faure
RB
 20  Ivana Dežić 
 39  Natalia Nosek

Transfers
Transfers for the 2023–24 season

 Joining
 Frida Rosell (CB) (from  IK Sävehof)
 Malin Sandberg (RB) (from  H 65 Höör)
 Suzanne Wajoka (LW) (from  Fleury Loiret HB)
 Mélina Peillon (RW) (from  Saint-Amand Handball)

 Leaving
 Juliette Faure (CB) (to  Brest Bretagne Handball)
 Natalia Nosek (RB) (to  CS Gloria Bistrița-Năsăud)
 Camille Aoustin (LW) (to ?) Lucie Granier (RW) (to  Metz Handball) Audrey Dembele (LB) (to  Brest Bretagne Handball)''

European record

References

External links
Official website

French handball clubs
Handball clubs established in 1970
Sport in Besançon